This is a list of notable events in Latin music (music from Spanish- and Portuguese-speaking areas of Latin America, Europe, and the United States) that took place in 2009.

Events
April 23 – The 16th Billboard Latin Music Awards are held at the BankUnited Center at the University of Miami in Coral Gables, Florida.
Panamanian singer and songwriter Flex wins the Billboard Latin Music Award for Hot Latin Song of the Year for "Te Quiero".
95/08 by Spanish singer and songwriter Enrique Iglesias wins the Billboard Latin Music Award for Top Latin Album of the Year.
Mexican-American musician Carlos Santana receives a Lifetime achievement award.
November 5 – The 10th Annual Latin Grammy Awards are held at the Mandalay Bay Events Center in Las Vegas, Nevada.
Puerto Rican band Calle 13 and Mexican group Café Tacuba win the Latin Grammy Award for Record of the Year for "No Hay Nadie Como Tú".
Los de Atrás Vienen Conmigo by Calle 13 wins the Latin Grammy Award for Album of the Year.
Argentine artist Claudia Brant, Puerto Rican musician Luis Fonsi and American artist Gen Rubin win the Latin Grammy Award for Song of the Year for "Aquí Estoy Yo".
Alexander Acha wins Best New Artist.

Number-ones albums and singles by country
List of number-one albums of 2009 (Mexico)
List of number-one albums of 2009 (Spain)
List of number-one singles of 2009 (Spain)
List of number-one Billboard Top Latin Albums of 2009
List of number-one Billboard Hot Latin Songs of 2009

Awards
2009 Premio Lo Nuestro
2009 Billboard Latin Music Awards
2009 Latin Grammy Awards
2009 Tejano Music Awards

Albums released

First quarter

January

February

March

Second quarter

April

May

June

Third quarter

July

August

September

Fourth quarter

October

November

December

Dates unknown

Best-selling records

Best-selling albums
The following is a list of the top 10 best-selling Latin albums in the United States in 2009, according to Billboard.

Best-performing songs
The following is a list of the top 10 best-performing Latin songs in the United States in 2009, according to Billboard.

Deaths
January 13 – Pedro Aguilar, Puerto Rican mambo dancer and choreographer, 81
January 20 – Ramón de Algeciras, Spanish flamenco guitarist, composer and lyricist, 71
February 15 – Joe Cuba, American conga drummer, "Father of Latin Boogaloo", 77

References

 
Latin music by year